The Chief of Engineers is a principal United States Army staff officer at The Pentagon. The Chief advises the Army on engineering matters, and serves as the Army's topographer and proponent for real estate and other related engineering programs.  The Chief of Engineers is the senior service engineer for the Department of Defense, responsible for integrating all aspects of combat, general and geospatial engineering across the Joint Force.

The Chief of Engineers also commands the United States Army Corps of Engineers.  As commander of the US Army Corps of Engineers, the Chief of Engineers leads a major Army command that is the world's largest public engineering, design and construction management agency. This office defines policy and guidance, and it plans direction for the organizations within the Corps. The Chief of Engineers is currently a lieutenant general billet but in the past has been held by field grade officers as low as major. Civilian oversight of the Chief of Engineers is provided by the Assistant Secretary of the Army (Civil Works).

Chiefs of Engineers

See also
Corps Castle
Gold Castles

References

 Inline citations

External links

 

 01